List:
Human dermal fibroblasts → multilineage blood progenitors (Oct4 and cytokine treatment)
Mouse dermal fibroblasts → polygonal hyaline chondrogenic cells (Klf4, c-Myc, Sox9)
Mouse dermal fibroblasts → cardiomyocytes (Oct4, Sox2, Klf4, JI1 and Bmp4)
Fibroblasts → neural stem/progenitor cells (Oct4, Sox2, c-Myc, Klf4)

See also
Transdifferentiation
Induced stem cells

References

Histology
Induced stem cells